Jacob Mikael Widell Zetterström (born 11 July 1998) is a Swedish footballer who plays for Djurgårdens IF as a goalkeeper.

Club career 
Widell Zetterström started his senior career in IFK Lidingö, joining Djurgårdens IF in 2019 and going on loan back to Lidingö the first season. Without having a place in the squad in 2020 due to head injury, he made his Djurgården debut in 2021.

International career 
Widell Zetterström made his full international debut for Sweden on 12 January 2023, playing for 45 minutes before being replaced by Oliver Dovin in a friendly 2–1 win against Iceland.

Career statistics

International

Honours
Djurgårdens IF
Allsvenskan: 2019

References

External links 
 Djurgården profile 

1998 births
Living people
Association football goalkeepers
Footballers from Stockholm
Swedish footballers
Allsvenskan players
IFK Lidingö players
Djurgårdens IF Fotboll players